The National Highway Traffic Safety Administration (NHTSA  ) is an agency of the U.S. federal government, part of the Department of Transportation. It describes its mission as "Save lives, prevent injuries, reduce vehicle-related crashes" related to transportation safety in the United States.

NHTSA is charged with writing and enforcing Federal Motor Vehicle Safety Standards as well as regulations for motor vehicle theft resistance and fuel economy, as part of the Corporate Average Fuel Economy (CAFE) system. FMVSS 209 was the first standard to become effective on March 1, 1967. NHTSA licenses vehicle manufacturers and importers, allows or blocks the import of vehicles and safety-regulated vehicle parts, administers the vehicle identification number (VIN) system, develops the anthropomorphic dummies used in U.S. safety testing as well as the test protocols themselves, and provides vehicle insurance cost information. The agency has asserted preemptive regulatory authority over greenhouse gas emissions, but this has been disputed by such state regulatory agencies as the California Air Resources Board.

The Federal Motor Vehicle Safety Standards are contained in the United States . Additional federal vehicle standards are contained elsewhere in the CFR. Another of NHTSA's major activities is the creation and maintenance of the data files maintained by the National Center for Statistics and Analysis. In particular, the Fatality Analysis Reporting System (FARS), has become a resource for traffic safety research not only in the United States, but throughout the world. Research contributions using FARS by researchers from many countries appear in many non-U.S. technical publications, and provide a significant database and knowledge bank on the subject. Even with this database, conclusive analysis of crash causes often remains difficult and controversial, with experts debating the veracity and statistical validity of results.

History
In 1964 and 1966, public pressure grew in the United States to increase the safety of cars, culminating with the publishing of Unsafe at Any Speed, by Ralph Nader, an activist lawyer, and the report prepared by the National Academy of Sciences entitled Accidental Death and Disability: The Neglected Disease of Modern Society.

In 1966, Congress held a series of publicized hearings regarding highway safety, passed legislation to make the installation of seat belts mandatory, and created the U.S. Department of Transportation on October 15, 1966. Legislation signed by President Lyndon Johnson earlier on September 9, 1966, included the National Traffic and Motor Vehicle Safety Act and Highway Safety Act that created the National Traffic Safety Agency, the National Highway Safety Agency, and the National Highway Safety Bureau, predecessor agencies to what would eventually become NHTSA. Once the Federal Motor Vehicle Safety Standards (FMVSS) came into effect, vehicles not certified by the maker or importer as compliant with US safety standards were no longer legal to import into the United States.

In 1972, the Motor Vehicle Information and Cost Savings Act expanded NHTSA's scope to include consumer information programs. Since then, automobiles have become far better at protecting their occupants in vehicle impacts. The number of deaths on American highways hovers around 33,000 annually, a lower death rate per vehicle-mile traveled than in the 1960s.

NHTSA has conducted numerous high-profile investigations of automotive safety issues, including the Audi 5000/60 Minutes affair, the Ford Explorer rollover problem, and the Toyota sticky accelerator pedal problem. The agency has introduced a proposal to mandate Electronic Stability Control on all passenger vehicles by the 2012 model year. This technology was first brought to public attention in 1997, with the Swedish moose test. Other than that, NHTSA has issued only a few regulations in the past 25 years. Most of the reduction in vehicle fatality rates during the last third of the 20th century were gained from the initial NHTSA safety standards during 1968–1984 and subsequent voluntary changes in vehicle crashworthiness by vehicle manufacturers.

Regulatory performance

Audits by the U.S. Department of Transportation's Office of the Inspector General in 2011, 2014, 2015, 2016, 2018, and 2021 have concluded that NHTSA is ineffectual; the 2021 audit found NHTSA failing to effectively issue or update Federal Motor Vehicle Safety Standards or to act within legally-prescribed timeframes on petitions and investigations; having no process in place for critical agency responsibilities like evaluating petitions, and having failed to implement consensus recommendations derived from the Inspector General's audit a decade before, in 2011. The 2018 audit found NHTSA incapable of conducting adequate, timely safety recalls. The 2015 audit found NHTSA's collection and analysis of safety-related data to be inadequate, and the agency to be lackadaisical and careless in examining safety defects.

Government data (from FARS for the U.S.) in a 2004 book by former General Motors safety researcher Leonard Evans shows other countries achieving greater traffic safety improvements over time than those achieved in the United States:

Research suggests one reason the U.S. continues to lag in traffic safety is the relatively high prevalence in the U.S. of pickup trucks and SUVs, which a 2003 study by the U.S. Transportation Research Board found are significantly less safe than passenger cars. Comparisons of past data with the present in the U.S. can result in distortions, due to a significant population increase and since the level of large commercial truck traffic has substantially increased from the 1960s, but highway capacity has not kept up. However, other factors exert significant influence; Canada has lower roadway death and injury rates despite a vehicle mix and regulations similar to those of the U.S. Nevertheless, the widespread use of truck-based vehicles as passenger carriers is correlated with roadway deaths and injuries not only directly by dint of vehicular safety performance per se, but also indirectly through the relatively low fuel costs that facilitate the use of such vehicles in North America. Motor vehicle fatalities decline as gasoline prices increase.

International counterparts and the grey market 
In 1958, under the auspices of the United Nations, a consortium called the Economic Commission for Europe had been established to normalize vehicle regulations across Europe to standardize best practices in vehicle design and equipment and minimize technical barriers to pan-European vehicle trade and traffic. This eventually became the World Forum for Harmonization of Vehicle Regulations, which began to promulgate what would eventually become the UN Regulations on the design, construction, and safety and emissions performance of vehicles and their components. Many of the world's countries accept or require vehicles and equipment built to the UN Regulations, but the U.S does not recognize the UN Regulations and blocks the importation of vehicles and components not manufacturer-certified as complying with the U.S. regulations.

Because of the unavailability in America of certain vehicle models, a grey market arose in the late 1970s. This provided a method to acquire vehicles not officially offered in the United States, but enough vehicles imported this way were faulty, shoddy, and unsafe that Mercedes-Benz of North America helped launch a successful congressional lobbying effort to close down the grey market in 1988. As a result, it was no longer possible to import foreign vehicles into the United States as a personal import, with few exceptions—primarily vehicles meeting Canadian regulations substantially similar to those of the United States, and vehicles imported temporarily for display or research purposes. In practice, the gray market involved a few thousand cars annually, before its virtual elimination in 1988.

In 1998, NHTSA exempted vehicles older than 25 years from the rules it administers, since these are presumed to be collector vehicles. In 1999, certain very low production volume specialist vehicles were also exempt for "Show and Display" purposes.

In the mid-1960s, when the framework was established for US vehicle safety regulations, the US auto market was an oligopoly, with three companies (GM, Ford, and Chrysler) controlling 85% of the market. The ongoing ban on newer vehicles considered safe in countries with lower vehicle-related death rates has created a perception that an effect of NHTSA's regulatory activity is to protect the U.S. market for a modified oligopoly consisting of the three U.S.-based automakers and the American operations of foreign-brand producers. It has been suggested that the impetus for NHTSA's seeming preoccupation with market control rather than vehicular safety performance is a result of overt market protections such as tariffs and local-content laws having become politically unpopular due to the increasing popularity of free trade, thus driving the industry to adopt less visible forms of trade restrictions in the form of technical regulations different from those outside the United States.

An example of the market-control effects of NHTSA's regulatory protocol is found in the agency's 1974 banning of the Citroën SM automobile, which contemporary journalists described as one of the safest vehicles available at the time. NHTSA disapproved the SM's designs featuring steerable headlamps that were not of the sealed beam design that was then mandatory in the U.S. as well as its height adjustable suspension, which made compliance with the 1973 bumper requirements cost-prohibitive. However, these regulations at low-speed collisions did not enhance occupant safety.

Vehicle manufacturers have acknowledged the functional equivalence of the UN and U.S. regulations, encouraged developing countries to recognize and accept both, and advocated for equal recognition of both systems in developed countries. However, some structural features of the U.S. legal system are incompatible with some aspects of the UN regulatory system.  Studies have concluded that commonizing regulations between the US and the rest of the world (which uses U.N. Regulations) would save significant money, likely without affecting safety.

Development of Standardized Field Sobriety Testing (SFST) 
NHTSA created a Standardized Field Sobriety Testing (SFST) training curriculum to prepare police officers and other qualified persons to conduct the SFST's for use in DWI investigations. This training was developed in combination with the International Association of Chiefs of Police (IACP) and has experienced remarkable success since its inception in the early 1980s.

Data-Driven Approaches to Crime and Traffic Safety (DDACTS) 
NHTSA, along with the Bureau of Justice Assistance and the National Institute of Justice (both part of the Department of Justice) has a long history of actively promoting the use of traffic stops by local police to combat crime and search for drugs. This approach is controversial and has, in the past, been accused of encouraging racial profiling of motorists.

Cost and cost-benefit
NHTSA uses cost–benefit analysis for every safety device, system, or design feature mandated for installation on vehicles. No device, system, or design feature may be mandated unless it costs no more than a specified amount of money per life saved, or will save more money (in property damage, health care, etc.) than it costs. Requirements are balanced through estimated costs and estimated benefits. For example, FMVSS #208 effectively mandates the installation of frontal airbags in all new vehicles in the United States, for it is written such that no other technology can meet the stipulated requirements. It has been argued that even using conservative cost figures and optimistic benefit figures, airbags' cost–benefit ratio so extreme that it may fall outside of the cost–benefit requirements for mandatory safety devices. Cost–benefit requirements have been used as the basis for lighting-related regulation in the U.S; for example, while many countries in the world since at least the early 1970s have required rear turn signals to emit amber light so they might be distinguished from adjacent red brake lamps, U.S. regulations permit rear turn signals to emit either amber or red light. This has historically been justified on grounds of lower manufacturing cost and greater automaker styling freedom in the context of no demonstrated safety benefit to amber over red. More recent NHTSA-sponsored research has demonstrated that amber rear turn signals provide significantly better crash avoidance than red ones, and NHTSA has found there is no significant cost penalty to amber signals versus red ones, yet the agency has not moved to require amber—instead proposing in 2015 to award extra NCAP points to passenger vehicles with amber rear turn signals. As of September 2022, however, the agency has not put this proposal into effect.

Fuel economy

CAFE Regulations
NHTSA also administers the Corporate Average Fuel Economy (CAFE), which is intended to incentivize the production of fuel-efficient vehicles by dint of fuel economy requirements measured against the sales-weighted harmonic average of each manufacturer's range of vehicles. Many governments outside North America promote fuel economy by heavily taxing motor fuel and/or by including a vehicle's weight, engine size, or fuel economy in calculating vehicle registration taxes (road tax).

Performance
Information about manufacturers' CAFE performance and compliance beginning with the 2011 model year can be found on the NHTSA website, their Public Information Center, for both the light-duty and heavy-duty vehicle program. As of 2022, for model years 2005–2010 information can be found on the NHTSA website as Summary of Fuel Economy Performance, 15 December 2014.

Aerodynamics brings change to NHTSA
Automakers faced an inherent conflict between NHTSA's stringent headlight legislation, which mandated unaerodynamic sealed-beam headlights, and the Corporate Average Fuel Economy standard, which effectively mandated that automakers develop ways to improve the ability of the car to cleave the air. As a result, in the early 1980s, automakers lobbied for a modification of the mandate for fixed shape sealed-beam headlamps.

NHTSA adopted Ford's proposal for low-cost aerodynamic headlamps with polycarbonate lenses and transverse-filament bulbs. The minimum allowed performance and materials durability requirements of this new headlamp system are lower than those of the previous sealed beam system.

For the 1984 model year, Ford introduced the Lincoln Mark VII, the first car since 1939 to be sold in the U.S. market with architectural headlamps as part of its aerodynamic design. These composite headlamps, when new to the American market, were commonly but improperly referred to as "Euro" headlamps, since aerodynamic headlamps were already common in Europe. Though conceptually similar to European headlamps with nonstandardized shape and replaceable-bulb construction, these headlamps conform to the SAE headlamp design standards contained in the U.S. Federal Motor Vehicle Safety Standard 108, and not to the international safety standards used worldwide outside North America.

NCAP

United States has been the first country/region to have a NCAP program before being copied by other regional, European, American, Asiatic, Oceanic or global NCAP programs. This makes New Car Assessment Program can be colloquial and design either US NCAP or generic NCAP.

In 1979, NHTSA created the/a New Car Assessment Program (NCAP) in response to Title II of the Motor Vehicle Information and Cost Savings Act of 1972, to encourage manufacturers to build safer vehicles and consumers to buy them. Since that time, the agency has improved the program by adding rating programs, facilitating access to test results, and revising the format of the information to make it easier for consumers to understand. NHTSA asserts the program has influenced manufacturers to build vehicles that consistently achieve high ratings.

The first standardized 35 mph front crash test was on May 21, 1979, and the first results were released on October 15 that year.

To improve the dissemination of NCAP ratings, and as a result of the Safe, Accountable, Flexible, Efficient Transportation Equity Act: A Legacy for Users (SAFETEA–LU), the agency has issued a Final Rule requiring manufacturers to place NCAP star ratings on the Monroney sticker (automobile price sticker). The rule had a September 1, 2007 compliance date.

Administration
The agency has an annual budget of $1.09 billion (FY2020). The agency classifies most of its spending under the driver safety heading, with a minority spent on vehicle safety, and a smaller amount on energy security matters of which it is in charge, i.e., vehicular fuel economy.

Past administrators

See also
Automobile safety rating
Crash test
FMVSS
Grey-market vehicle
Insurance Institute for Highway Safety
Intelligent Transportation Systems Institute
National Transportation Safety Board
Road-traffic safety
Title 23 of the Code of Federal Regulations
UNECE
Vehicle inspection
Work-related road safety in the United States

References

Further reading
Kevin M. McDonald, "Shifting Out of Park: Moving Auto Safety from Recalls to Reason" (Lawyers & Judges Publishing, 2006). .
 
 
The Century Council's Report on Alcohol-Related Traffic Fatalities in the United States (2006)
 Peltzman, Sam. "The Effects of Automobile Safety Regulation." The Journal of Political Economy 83, no. 4 (August 1975): 677–725.

External links
 
 49 CFR Chapter V (National Highway Traffic Safety Administration)
 National Highway Traffic Safety Administration in the Federal Register
 safercar.gov for official ratings, tips, and recalls
 Regulations regarding vehicle importation into the U.S.
 UNECE vehicle safety regulations
 
 
 Traffic Safety
 National Archives entry
 Washington Post article
 DOT's list of operating administrators of the NHTSA

1970 establishments in the United States
Road safety organizations
Automotive safety
New Car Assessment Programs
United States Department of Transportation agencies
Government agencies established in 1970
Highway Traffic Safety